Gavin Sherlock is an English-American professor of genetics at Stanford University.

Early and personal life
Sherlock obtained a Bachelor of Science degree in genetics in 1991 from the University of Manchester, where he also earned a Ph.D. in molecular biology three years later. Gavin is a huge fan of Manchester United and loves to referee the American Youth Soccer Organization's soccer games. He also works as a DJ at the Department Retreat and loves traveling.

Research
Sherlock was involved with the Stanford Microarray Database, an early attempt to organize the extensive data generated by DNA microarray analysis. In 2012, Sherlock, along with Barbara Dunn and Daniel Kvitek, published a study of the influence of yeast on the flavor of wine during fermentation.

References

External links

20th-century births
Living people
American geneticists
English geneticists
Alumni of the University of Manchester
Stanford University faculty
English emigrants to the United States
Year of birth missing (living people)
Place of birth missing (living people)